Matías Maximiliano Jara (born April 6, 1987 in Buenos Aires) is an Argentine footballer who last played for Temperley.

Career 

Jara started playing for the Comisión de Actividades Infantiles, a team from the southern city of Comodoro Rivadavia. He was an important part of the team that avoided relegation from the Primera B Nacional (second division) during the 2007-08 season after defeating Patronato in the relegation playoff. Jara scored two goals in the second game to secure the 5-1 overall victory.

Jara joined Godoy Cruz in the Argentine First Division for the 2009-10 season. He scored the first goal of the Apertura tournament on Godoy Cruz' victory 2-0 over Gimnasia y Esgrima de La Plata. He also scored one goal and assisted in another in Godoy Cruz' historical 3-2 victory against Boca Juniors in the Bombonera stadium.

In January 2010 Jara joined Chilean side Huachipato. However, he returned to his home country in August of that same year, joining second division side Chacarita Juniors.

Jara signed with FC Dallas of Major League Soccer on August 7, 2012. However, he was released just three months later without making a first team appearance.

References

External links 
 
 

1987 births
Living people
Footballers from Buenos Aires
Argentine footballers
Association football forwards
Argentine Primera División players
Comisión de Actividades Infantiles footballers
Godoy Cruz Antonio Tomba footballers
Chacarita Juniors footballers
Guillermo Brown footballers
FC Dallas players
Expatriate footballers in Chile